Mugisha Muhanga Margaret also known as Muhanga Margaret is a female Ugandan politician. She is also the State Minister for Primary Healthcare  appointed by Yoweri Kaguta Museveni in 2021, Rotarian, journalist, development consultant and a businesswoman. Margaret was the Woman Member of Parliament of Kabarole District in the eighth and the Burahya County MP Kabarole District in the tenth parliament of Uganda. She later joined as the Woman Member of Parliament of Kabarole District of North Division Fort Portal City in the eleventh Parliament of Uganda under the National Resistance Movement political party.

Personal life 
She was born to Constance Muhangazima Adyeri. She is married to Michael Mugisa, the former District Chairman Kabarole and the executive director of National Forestry Authority with many children from whom she is a guardian to and  many of them are orphans. Muhanga's husband replaced Damiano Akankwasa at the National Forestry Authority, after  Akankwasawas convicted for abuse of office by causing financial loss of 2.8 billion Uganda shillings.

She is the elder sister to  Andrew Mwenda, a Ugandan journalist. She is also a sister to UPDF’s Maj. Gen Kayanja Muhanga and Maj. Henry Baguma,  a historical Director under the Internal Security Organisation (ISO). Muhanga's hobbies are cooking and cleaning her house.

Education 
She went to Nyakasura School.

Career 
She was employed at the New Vision in the early 1990s, covering parliament. Margaret started the Uganda Parliamentary Journalists Association with Henry Ochieng who was the Chairman and she was his Vice Chair.  She is the CEO of Diamond Empowerment Limited and Fort Fun City Fort Portal. She served as an administrator at the office of the president.

She was the former Woman Member of Parliament for Kabarole District 2006-2011 and later became the Burahya County MP Kabarole District in the 10th parliament. She joined politics because of her love for helping people, however she has no interest in politics.

Controversy 
In 2021, she told the former Speaker of Parliament, Rebecca Kadaga that she would go back to Busoga and grow sugarcanes. This was after Kadaga disrespected the National Resistance Movement (NRM) party decision of fronting the late Jacob Oulanyah for parliamentary speakership even after making a tacit agreement in 2016 when the latter chose not to contest against her.

She has been conspired to defraud UBC of its land.

She among other people led a successful strike at Parliament and pulled out all the journalists from all media houses in 1999 and they told journalists not to go back for one week because they wanted an office and Parliament wasn’t giving it to them.

See also 

 List of members of the eleventh Parliament of Uganda
 List of members of the eighth Parliament of Uganda
 Member of Parliament
 Parliament of Uganda
 National Resistance Movement
 Kabarole District

External links 

 Website of the Parliament of Uganda

References 

Living people
People from Kabarole District
Women members of the Parliament of Uganda
Members of the Parliament of Uganda
National Resistance Movement politicians
Ugandan journalists
Ugandan women journalists
Ugandan businesspeople
Year of birth missing (living people)